280 (two hundred [and] eighty) is the natural number after 279 and before 281.

In mathematics
The denominator of the eighth harmonic number, 280 is an octagonal number. 280 is the smallest octagonal number that is a half of another octagonal number.

There are 280 plane trees with ten nodes.
As a consequence of this, 18 people around a round table can shake hands with each other in non-crossing ways, in 280 different ways (this includes rotations).

Integers from 281 to 289

281

282
282 = 2·3·47, sphenic number, number of planar partitions of 9

283
283 prime, twin prime with 281, strictly non-palindromic number, 4283 - 3283 is prime

284
284 and 220 form the first pair of amicable numbers, as the divisors of 284 add up to 220 and vice versa.

285
285 = 3·5·19, sphenic number, square pyramidal number, Harshad number, repdigit in base 7 (555), vertically symmetric number .

286
286 = 2·11·13, sphenic number, tetrahedral number, nontotient.

286 is the smallest even pseudoprime (not divisible by 3) to base 3, which implies 3285 ≡ 1 (mod 286).

287
287 = 7·41, sum of three consecutive primes (89 + 97 + 101), sum of five consecutive primes (47 + 53 + 59 + 61 + 67), sum of nine consecutive primes (17 + 19 + 23 + 29 + 31 + 37 + 41 + 43 + 47), pentagonal number.

288

289
289 = 172, centered octagonal number, Friedman number since (8 + 9)2 = 289.

References 

Integers